Freedom of Expression Award is an annual award given by the National Board of Review since 1995.

List of winners

1990s
1995: Zhang Yimou
1996: The People vs. Larry Flynt
1997: Red Corner
1998: Bernardo Bertolucci
1999: The Insider

2000s
2000: Bamboozled,  Before Night Falls,  The Circle,  Kadosh,  Quills,  Sound and Fury,  A Time for Drunken Horses, The Visit
2001: Baran, Jung in the Land of the Mujaheddin,  Kandahar
2002: Ararat,  Bloody Sunday,  The Grey Zone,  Rabbit-Proof Fence 
2003: Capturing the Friedmans,  Dirty Pretty Things,  The Magdalene Sisters,  September 11
2004: Fahrenheit 9/11, The Passion of the Christ, Conspiracy of Silence
2005: Innocent Voices, The Untold Story of Emmett Louis Till
2006: Water, World Trade Center
2007: The Great Debaters, Persepolis
2008: Trumbo
2009: Burma VJ, Invictus, The Most Dangerous Man in America

2010s
2010: Fair Game, Conviction, Howl
2011: Crime After Crime, Pariah
2012: The Central Park Five, Promised Land
2013: Wadjda
2014: Rosewater, Selma
2015: Beasts of No Nation, Mustang
2016: Cameraperson
2017: First They Killed My Father, Let It Fall: Los Angeles 1982–1992
2018: 22 July, On Her Shoulders
2019: For Sama, Just Mercy

2020s
2020: One Night in Miami
2021: Flee
2022: All the Beauty and the Bloodshed, Argentina, 1985

References

External links
Archive

National Board of Review Awards
Awards established in 1995
Freedom of expression